Anabaptist hunters were armed envoys used by some cantons of the Old Swiss Confederacy in order to drive out or suppress the local Anabaptist population (Swiss Brethren). 

In Lower Austria, Dietrich von Hartitsch was hired as a professional Anabaptist hunter by Emperor Ferdinand. In 1539 he captured 136 Anabaptists, many of whom were sold as galley slaves to Admiral Andrea Doria.

References

Anabaptism
Persecution of Christians